K.V.V. Belgica Edegem Sport is a Belgian association football club from the municipality of Edegem in the suburb of Antwerp.  It is currently playing in the first division of the regional league of the Antwerp province.

History
It was founded in 1908 as Sporting F.C. Belgica and it registered to the Belgian Football Association in 1910 to receive the matricule n°375.  Between 1914 and 1924 the football team from this sports club was not active.  At its come-back the club changed its name to Belgica F.C. Edegem.  In 1930 Belgica played its first season in the second division.  In its third season at that level, the club won its league and thus played in the first division from 1933, finishing 12th on 14. The next season the club was 14th and then played in the second division until World War II.  The club had meanwhile changed its name in 1936 to K.F.C. Belgica Edegem.

After World War II, the club played at lower levels in the Belgian football league system.  It merged with K.V.V. Edegem Sport in 1967 to become K.V.V. Belgica Edegem Sport.

Coaching staff
 Coach:  Hugo Wuyts
 Coach:  Jerome Cop
 Coach:  Dave Praet

External links
 Official website

References
 Belgian football clubs history
 RSSSF Archive – 1st and 2nd division final tables

Association football clubs established in 1908
Football clubs in Belgium
1908 establishments in Belgium
K.V.V. Belgica Edegem Sport
K.V.V. Belgica Edegem Sport
Belgian Pro League clubs